Yeongdeung Halmang was the goddess of the winds and the sea in traditional Korean religion, particularly on the Jeju Island.

According to legend, the goddess resided in the East, but visited the island once a year, and sowed the foods of the sea, such as fish, seashells and other things which the inhabitants of the island lived of, and rituals were held to ask her to be generous.

References

Sea and river goddesses
Korean goddesses
Wind goddesses
Jeju mythology